Estádio Governador José Fragelli, usually known as Verdão, was a multi-purpose stadium in Cuiabá, Brazil. The stadium, used mostly for football matches, holds 40,000, and was built in 1976. It was replaced by a new stadium in the city, seating about 40,000, that was used for the 2014 FIFA World Cup.

Verdão is owned by the Mato Grosso state government. The stadium is named after José Fragelli, who was the Mato Grosso's governor from 1970 until 1974, during the time of the stadium's construction. Verdão means Big Green in the Portuguese language. It was the home stadium of Mixto, Dom Bosco and Operário.

History
Construction started in 1973, The stadium had a planned capacity of 50,000 individuals and architectural design of Silvano Wendel, Verdão was the reason for harsh criticism of the administration of Fragelli. Budgeted at Cr$1,200,000.00, currency of the time, the work that was started in the Government Jose Fragelli, was finally completed in 1976, now in administration José Garcia Neto.

On March 12, 1975 The team of Fluminense and selection of Cuiaba faced in the match celebrating the partial completion of works at the opportunity when the team made history Cuiabá swinging for the first time the networks' Verdão. The following year, April 8, the stadium was finely finished with the presence of Flamengo and a square between the clubs in the capital, Mixto, Worker and Don Bosco, attended by over 44,000 fans.

In 1976, the construction work on Verdão was completed. The inaugural match was played on April 8 of that year, when Mixto beat Dom Bosco 2-0. The first goal of the stadium was scored by Mixto's Pastoril. The stadium's attendance record currently stands at 44,021, set in the inaugural match.

On August 9, 1980, the stadium entertained its biggest result, when Mixto beat Humaitá 14-0. Mixto's striker Elmo scored eight goals in this match.

World Cup 2014
Brazil won the right to host the 2014 FIFA World Cup, and Cuiabá was one of 18 cities bidding to host it. The state government planned to invest $250 million to build a new stadium in the place of Verdão. Cuiabá was announced as one of the 12 host cities on May 31, 2009.

The new stadium is planned to be a 40,000 all-seater and will include other projects such as a shopping mall and a convention center.

To construct the new stadium will be an investment for $450 million by the state government of Mato Grosso. The playing field will have dimensions of 70 by 110 meters.

The project also calls for spending $50 million for the construction of two training centers. The training fields will have dimensions of 65 by 100 meters and will be in regions close to the stadium Verdão.

On the outside, there is a forecast of five road works for traffic flow. One of them, Avenida das Torres, is already running, while the other four are under implementation.

In infrastructure, Cuiabá offers 26 hospitals and 5,514 beds. For accommodation, the city has 46 hotels and housing capacity stands at 24,508 people.

The stadium is apparently under demolition currently to make space for the new stadium. Demolition started on April 26, 2010 and is expected to be finished in less than 3 months.

See also
2014 FIFA World Cup

References

Enciclopédia do Futebol Brasileiro, Volume 2 - Lance, Rio de Janeiro: Aretê Editorial S/A, 2001.

External links
Templos do Futebol

Defunct football venues in Brazil
Multi-purpose stadiums in Brazil
Sports venues in Mato Grosso
Football venues in Mato Grosso
CE Operário Várzea-Grandense